Those famous women in Chinese history (歷代奇女子) is a 1988 ATV drama series produced in Hong Kong by Amy Wong.

Summary
The series is based on the life of four ancient historical female figure.

 Empress Lü Zhi (呂后) -  first female empress who took over the Han dynasty throne after the death of her husband emperor Gaozu.
 Yu Xuanji (魚玄機) - the bisexual Tang dynasty poet.
 Ti Ying (緹縈) - the girl who went up against Emperor Wen of Han to abolish the Five Punishments.
 (白寡婦)

Cast

References

Asia Television original programming
1988 Hong Kong television series debuts
1980s Hong Kong television series